Rhiner Allen Cruz Montero (born November 1, 1986) is a Dominican professional baseball pitcher for the Piratas de Campeche of the Mexican League. He has played in Major League Baseball (MLB) for the Houston Astros and Toronto Blue Jays, and in Nippon Professional Baseball (NPB) for the Tohoku Rakuten Golden Eagles. He played for Team Spain in the 2019 European Baseball Championship. He played for the team at the Africa/Europe 2020 Olympic Qualification tournament, in Italy in September 2019.

Professional career

Detroit Tigers
Cruz began his career with the Detroit Tigers in 2004. He spent the 2004 and 2005 seasons with the GCL Tigers. He was released after the 2005 season.

New York Mets
Cruz signed with the New York Mets organization for the 2007 season. In 2007, he played for the DSL Mets, GCL Mets, and Kingsport Mets. In 2008, Cruz played for the Brooklyn Cyclones and Savannah Sand Gnats. For 2009, Cruz played for Savannah the entirety of the season. In 2010, he was assigned to the St. Lucie Mets, where he would spend the entire season. In 2011, he spent time with St. Lucie, and the Binghamton Mets.

Houston Astros
Cruz was selected by the Astros the first overall selection of the 2011 Rule 5 draft. Cruz was named to the Astros' Opening Day roster. Cruz spent the 2012 season in the majors for the Astros. He also played parts of the 2013 season in the majors as well. On December 23, 2013, Cruz was sent outright to the Oklahoma City RedHawks, and off of the 40-man roster. He began 2016 with the RedHawks before he released on June 2, 2014, to pursue an opportunity in Japan.

Tohoku Rakuten Golden Eagles
In June 2014, the Astros permitted Cruz to sign with the Tohoku Rakuten Golden Eagles of Nippon Professional Baseball. Cruz would finish the 2014 season with the Eagles. Cruz also played the 2015 season with the Eagles before becoming a free agent at seasons end.

Leones de Yucatan
On April 30, 2016, Cruz signed with the Leones de Yucatán of the Mexican League. He was released on May 15, 2016.

Vaqueros Laguna
On May 18, 2016, Cruz signed with the Vaqueros Laguna, and was released on May 22.

Atlanta Braves
On December 13, 2016, Cruz signed a minor league deal with the Atlanta Braves. He spent the year with the Gwinnett Braves before he elected free agency on November 6, 2017.

Toronto Blue Jays
Cruz signed a minor league contract with the Toronto Blue Jays on January 25, 2018, and received an invitation to spring training. On July 4, 2018, Cruz had his contract selected and was added to the active roster. He pitched two shutout innings in relief that night against the New York Mets. He was placed on the disabled list with a groin injury a few days later and would not return that season.  On November 2, 2018, Cruz cleared waivers and entered free agency.

Piratas de Campeche
On June 23, 2022, Cruz was signed by the Piratas de Campeche of the Mexican League.

International career
Cruz played for the Spanish national baseball team at the 2009 Baseball World Cup and the 2013 World Baseball Classic.

In 2022, Cruz was selected to represent Spain at the 2023 World Baseball Classic qualification.

Personal life
He held dual Dominican Republic and Spanish citizenship.

Cruz' brother, José, also plays for the Spanish national team.

References

External links

NPB

1986 births
Living people
Binghamton Mets players
Brooklyn Cyclones players
Buffalo Bisons (minor league) players
Dominican Republic expatriate baseball players in Canada
Dominican Republic expatriate baseball players in Japan
Dominican Republic expatriate baseball players in Mexico
Dominican Republic expatriate baseball players in the United States
Dominican Summer League Mets players
Gigantes del Cibao players
Gulf Coast Mets players
Gulf Coast Tigers players
Gwinnett Braves players
Houston Astros players
Kingsport Mets players
Leones de Yucatán players
Leones del Caracas players
Major League Baseball pitchers
Major League Baseball players from the Dominican Republic
Mexican League baseball pitchers
Nippon Professional Baseball pitchers
Oklahoma City RedHawks players
Piratas de Campeche players
Savannah Sand Gnats players
Spanish baseball players
Spanish expatriate sportspeople in Canada
Spanish expatriate sportspeople in Japan
Spanish expatriate sportspeople in Mexico
Spanish expatriate sportspeople in the United States
Spanish people of Dominican Republic descent
Sportspeople of Dominican Republic descent
Sportspeople from Santo Domingo
St. Lucie Mets players
Tohoku Rakuten Golden Eagles players
Toronto Blue Jays players
Vaqueros Laguna players
2013 World Baseball Classic players
2019 European Baseball Championship players
Dominican Republic expatriate baseball players in Venezuela